Roann is an Eastern rig dragger located at Mystic Seaport in Mystic, Connecticut, United States. Roann was built in 1947 in Thomaston, Maine by Newbert & Wallace and was used to fish for flounder, cod, and haddock. Mystic Seaport acquired the vessel to add to their collection of watercraft after she became obsolete in the 1970s. In 2009, Roann underwent a complete restoration.

References

Tourist attractions in New London County, Connecticut
Museum ships in Mystic, Connecticut
1947 ships
Fishing ships of the United States
Ships built in Thomaston, Maine